William Moorcroft (dates of birth and death unknown) was an English first-class cricketer.

Moorcroft made a single first-class appearance for Hampshire in 1911 against Gloucestershire. Moorcroft was not required to bat in the match and bowled 19 wicketless overs.

External links
William Moorcroft at Cricinfo
William Moorcroft at CricketArchive
William Moorcroft st EspnCrickInfo

English cricketers
Hampshire cricketers